Robert Whitney Waterman (December 15, 1826 – April 12, 1891) was an American politician. He served as the 17th governor of California from September 12, 1887, until January 8, 1891.

Early years
Waterman was born on December 15, 1826, in Fairfield, New York. He was born to John Dean Waterman and Mary Graves Waldo.  His middle name derives from the second wife (Clarissa (Dwight) Whitney) of his maternal grandfather.  He had seven siblings, including James Sears Waterman, John Calvin Waterman, Henry Franklin Waterman, Charlotte Judith Waterman, Mary Waterman, Charles Waterman, Caroline Waldo Waterman, and Theodore Francis Waterman.

Illinois
Waterman moved to Newbury, Illinois, when he was thirteen to join his brother as a clerk.  
Until 1850, he was a store clerk and postmaster in Geneva, Illinois. In 1850, he sold his assets and headed to California.  He traveled with F.A. Park, and befriended Brigham Young in Salt Lake City along the way.  When he arrived in California, he joined one of his brothers prospecting near the South Fork of the Feather River on Oregon Creek.  In 1851, Waterman returned to his family in Wilmington, Illinois, and became a successful grain dealer.  He returned to Illinois, and helped form the Illinois Republican party in 1854 and published the Willmington Independent newspaper. In 1856, he was one of two Illinois delegates to the first Republican National Convention in Bloomington, Illinois.  The other was Abraham Lincoln.  In 1860 he played a key role in delivering Illinois to Abraham Lincoln.

Return to California
In 1873, Waterman returned to California and became a machinery salesman in Redwood City, California.  In 1874, he moved to San Bernardino, California. He operated the Stonewall Jackson Mine which netted him $500 a day.

In 1880, while residing in San Bernardino, Waterman discovered a silver mine with John Porter a few miles north of Barstow, California, then called Grapevine.  In 1881, he formed a mining partnership with John Porter called Waterman and Porter, with 3/4 of the interest owned by Waterman.  A stamp mill settlement about four miles (6 km) away was named Waterman.  The Southern Pacific Railroad came through Waterman in 1882 and 100 men were employed at the mill and mine.  The mine produced 40,000 tons of ore worth US$1.7 million before it closed in 1887 after silver prices declined.

In 1886, he purchased Rancho Cuyamaca, including California's Stonewall gold mine.  On the Cuyamaca Ranch, he raised cattle and helped build the San Diego, Cuyamaca, and Eastern Railroad.

He was elected lieutenant governor in 1886 as a Republican, and he became governor in 1887 upon the death of Governor Washington Bartlett.  The 1886 election was the first split between the two posts in California's history.

As governor, the "Waterman Rifles" militia was authorized for San Bernardino, California, named in his honor since he was a resident of the City prior to election.   In 1889, possibly at Waterman's urging, the  Harlem tract in Patton, California was chosen for the first Southern California Insane Asylum.  It opened in 1893 and would become Patton State Hospital in the Highland area of San Bernardino.  He served on the U.C. Regents as an ex officio member as both lieutenant governor and governor.  His administration suffered from his lack of elected office and poor advisory support.  He strongly supported the Congressional Resolution creating Yosemite National Park.

The question whether to divide California was a major issue in his term.  His nickname was "Old Honesty", he would not tolerate drunkenness, overspending, nor dishonesty, and vowed to run the state as a business.  He chastised the Legislature for having 228 clerks when only 35 were authorized.

Though he served out the remainder of the term, his poor health caused him not to seek re-election.  He moved to San Diego, where he is buried in Mt. Hope Cemetery.  In 1891, he purchased for US$17,000 a Queen Anne-style house built in 1889 known as the Long-Waterman Mansion, now located at 2408 First Avenue, San Diego, 92101.

Family life
Waterman married Jane Gardner (November 8, 1829, in Stanstead, Quebec – April 12, 1914, in Barstow, California) on September 29, 1847, in Belvedere, Illinois. His children were:
 Frank G. Waterman (Born September 12, 1848, in Belvidere, Illinois, died on August 20, 1853)
 Waldo Sprague Waterman (born February 1, 1860, in Wilmington, Illinois), married Hazel Emma Wood in Erie Villa, California on April 11, 1889, died February 23, 1903, in San Diego, California)
 James Sears Waterman, (born August 22, 1853, in Wilmington, Illinois, died January 19, 1930), married Sarah C. Brown on December 15, 1902)
 Mary Pamela Waterman-Rice (born April 9, 1850, in Belvidere, Illinois, died November 3, 1925), married to Hyland W. Rice, San Bernardino County's Public Administrator)
 Helen Jane Waterman (born December 18, 1856, in Wilmington, Illinois, died October 14, 1945, Berkeley, California)
 Anna Charlotte Waterman (b. April 2, 1866, In Wilmington, Illinois) married Irving M. Scott in San Diego, CA, Sept. 29, 1891
 Abby Lou Waterman (b. February 21, 1869, in Wilmington, Illinois, died April, 1941)

Legacy
After his death, on April 12, 1891, the U.S. Supreme Court ruled in the case of Waterman v. Alden  reported at 143 U.S. 196.  That case involved the will of his brother, James S. Waterman of Sycamore Illinois, who died on July 19, 1883, without children or descendants.  On May 14, 1881, Waterman gave his brother an agreement in writing to give his brother within 12 months on demand 24/100th of mining property in California.  Waterman testified that the value was $1,000,000 at the time.  James Waterman advanced $25,000 to $30,000 to the Waterman Porter partnership, part of which was repaid before James' death.  James also held five promissary notes dated in late 1881, for $10,000, payable from February to March 1882 at 8 percent per annum interest.  The notes were transferred by Robert Waterman to Philander M. Alden and George S. Robinson, citizens of Illinois and executors of James' estate.  The Court ruled that the will did not include the notes.

Today, Waterman Avenue, Waterman Gardens, and Waterman Canyon are still named for him in San Bernardino, California, as well as Waterman Road at the western margin of Barstow, south of State Route 58 and north of the Mojave River.

Waterman's papers and photographs are in The Bancroft Library at UC Berkeley and the San Diego Historical Society.

References

Further reading

External links
Guide to the Waterman Family Papers, 1839-1906 at The Bancroft Library
 

Republican Party governors of California
Lieutenant Governors of California
1826 births
1891 deaths
Illinois Republicans
19th-century American politicians
Burials at Mount Hope Cemetery (San Diego)